Sergejs Inšakovs (born 27 December 1971 in Tula) is a retired Latvian athlete who competed in sprinting events. He represented his country at the 1996 Summer Olympics, as well as the 1995 and 1997 World Championships.

Competition record

Personal bests
Outdoor
100 metres – 10.28 (+0.6 m/s) (Athens 1997)
200 metres – 20.41 (+1.3 m/s) (Atlanta 1996) NR
Indoor
60 metres – 6.77 (Riga 2002)
200 metres – 21.26 (Mälmo 1998) NR

References

1971 births
Living people
People from Tula, Russia
Soviet male sprinters
Latvian male sprinters
Athletes (track and field) at the 1996 Summer Olympics
Olympic athletes of Latvia
World Athletics Championships athletes for Latvia